MyRichUncle was a loan product that was marketed to students by the American company MRU Holdings, Inc. (NASDAQ: UNCL). Incorporated in the state of Delaware on March 2, 2000, MyRichUncle entered the student lending market as an originator and holder of private student loans. By 2007, the company was listed on the NASDAQ composite and expanded into holding Federal Family Education Loan Program (FFELP) loans. MyRichUncle was one of the first companies to use credit algorithms, combined with traditional credit scoring, to determine the terms a student's loan would carry. These proprietary analytic models and decision tools were positioned as a "human capital investment" approach to underwriting student loans.

In 2007, MyRichUncle ran a New York Times advertising campaign that publicized the practice of financial aid offices having relationships with student loan companies. The New York Attorney General, Andrew M. Cuomo, launched an investigation into deceptive marketing practices in the student loan industry shortly thereafter, the result of which was a marketing code of conduct that eight lenders (Campus Door, EduCap, GMAC Bank, Graduate Loan Associates, Nelnet, NextStudent, Xanthus Financial Services, and MyRichUncle) agreed to follow.

Between May 2005 and September 2008, MRU Holdings, the parent holding company of MyRichUncle, originated over $550 million in student loans and became one of the largest providers of private student loans, behind top lenders such as Sallie Mae, Citibank, and JPMorgan Chase. On February 9, 2009, MRU Holdings filed for Chapter 7 bankruptcy and suspended all its operations.

History

MyRichUncle's co-founders, Raza Khan and Vishal Garg, met at Stuyvesant High School in New York City and attended New York University together. In June 1999, Khan and Garg incorporated Iempower Inc., planning to enable investors to purchase an economic share of an individual's future income stream for a set amount of time.  As they developed their business, they found that their original concept had significant crossover potential in the education financing market. Students, who have a large, recurring need for financing their immediate education expenditures, typically do not own any assets other than their potential future earnings as a result of their education. However, these education endeavors could be used to predict future income, which in turn, could be used to underwrite student loans. This concept was originally proposed by Nobel Laureate Milton Friedman in 1954 as the optimal means of financing education. Further work by Nobel Laureates Gary Becker and James Tobin validated the concept and its applicability to education finance.

In May 2001, the founders launched www.myrichuncle.com, Iempower's consumer-facing brand; through this website, investors could defray a student's undergraduate or graduate degree expenses in exchange for a fixed percentage of that student's future income for a set period after graduation.  In order to decide how to allocate investor financing to students and at what rates, Iempower built a proprietary data model that used historical data going as far back as the 1960s to predict a student's future income and career prospects based upon a variety of academic and credit factors. Over the course of 2001, the founders successfully raised $3 million to invest in students through programs such as the Robertson Education Empowerment Fund and the Education Investment Fund LLC, among others.

Iempower suffered a setback in 2001 when the company's offices, located on the 78th floor of 1 WTC, were destroyed in the September 11, 2001 attacks on the World Trade Center. The company's recovery was later profiled by Entrepreneur magazine.

In the following years, MyRichUncle rebuilt and demand for its Education Investment product grew to the point that it significantly exceeded the investment capacity of the company. Around that time, the founders began to notice that a significant number of its Education Investment applicants also had private student loans, which, at the time, was the fastest-growing segment of consumer finance. MyRichUncle decided to enter the private student loan industry. Entry into the private student loan business, which was traditionally the mainstay of large banks and Sallie Mae, required the company to raise significant amounts of external capital. In July 2004, Iempower, with an equity capital raise of $4.2 million, entered into a reverse public merger with Pacific Technologies, a publicly traded company. Upon completion of the takeover, Iempower Inc. changed its name to MRU Holdings, Inc.

In February 2005, MRU Holdings obtained a $165 million credit facility, expandable to $300 million, for funding private student loans from Nomura Credit and Capital Corporation, a subsidiary of Nomura Holdings, Japan's largest investment bank.  In May 2005, it began offering private student loans under the brand name MyRichUncle. In January 2006, MRU Holdings obtained a $175 million credit facility with Merrill Lynch Bank USA and also closed a $29 million PIPE offering with Merrill Lynch Private Equity Partners, Battery Ventures, Lehman Brothers, and several senior MBNA executives.

In May 2006, MRU introduced its PrePrime product to the market after raising investment funds through a consortium of European investors. MRU announced this product as the first of its kind, stating that it "put the 'student' back into the student lending equation". By April 27, 2007, MRU was able to expand its ability to originate PrePrime loans by securing a $100 million credit facility from Germany's fifth-largest bank, DZ Bank.

In June 2006, MyRichUncle introduced its federal loan program as a complement to its private student loan products.

In October 2006, MRU Holdings was listed on NASDAQ under the symbol UNCL. The company had a market capitalization of over $200 million.

In 2007, MRU Holdings entered into several acquisitions and partnership deals in order to enhance its product offering.  MRU Holdings purchased Embark Corp. on February 12, 2007, from The Princeton Review. Embark provides online admissions applications and enrollment management services to colleges and universities, and to a number of other institutions, foundations, and scholarship and fellowship programs. In March 2007, one month after the Embark purchase, MRU Holdings announced a partnership with STA Travel to provide travel loans for study abroad students. In April 2007, MRU Holdings announced an exclusive marketing partnership with The Princeton Review. In June 2007, MRU Holdings closed its first securitization transaction (2007-A), issuing $200 million in principal amount of asset-backed securities through Merrill Lynch & Co. Of the $200 million in bonds issued, $165 million were rated AAA, with a $21.5 million tranche rated A, and a $13 million tranche rated BB by Standard & Poor's and Moody's. The issue had a number of innovative features, including the first issuance of BB-rated securities in a private student loan securitization transaction, and the first time a new issuer transaction was able to receive premium proceeds. 

In July 2008, MRU Holdings closed its second securitization, issuing $140 million in principal amount of asset-backed securities through Merrill Lynch, Goldman Sachs & Co. and BB&T Capital Markets. The securitization was the only student loan securitization transaction completed in nine months and was completed at a time when deals from larger issuers such as Sallie Mae and First Marblehead were rumored to be in the market, but unable to be completed.

Between May 2005 and September 2008, MRU Holdings originated over $550 million in student loans.

2007 student lending scandal

In 2006, MyRichUncle drew attention for publishing a New York Times advertisement questioning financial aid administrators' practice of taking "kickbacks" from lenders in exchange for a place on their "preferred lender" lists. The MyRichUncle campaign pointed out that these deceptive practices on the part of financial aid offices and lenders were resulting in higher interest rates for students and a lack of transparency for students into available education financing options.

In January 2007, New York Attorney General Andrew Cuomo began an investigation to uncover relationships between schools and lenders. MyRichUncle's campaign is often cited as a catalyst in initiating the attorney general's investigation of student lending practices. On March 15, the New York Attorney General released a summary of the investigation's early findings: "There is an unholy alliance between banks and institutions of higher education that may often not be in the students’ best interest", Andrew Cuomo said in a news release. "The financial arrangements between lenders and these schools are filled with the potential for conflicts of interest. In some cases they may even break the law." The following month, on April 4, 2007, the New York Attorney General released another statement: "We are seeing more and more suspicious practices and dealings between university officers and loan companies come to light. ...This creates even more questions about the integrity of the student loan industry and the process by which colleges steer students to loans."

As the scandal unfolded, MyRichUncle took the opportunity to distinguish itself from other lenders and started to market itself as the "conflict-free" alternative. MyRichUncle was attacked in the press by the established industry players. However, between March and May 2007, a number of related stories made it to press, confirming MyRichUncle's allegations of systemic misconduct in the student loan industry.

 In March 2007, it came to light that certain lenders were operating call centers providing financial advice for students where company employees would, in some cases, identify themselves as university advisers. Nelnet was found to be operating a call center supporting ten different universities (including Texas Tech and Wayne State University). Sallie Mae was identified as operating call centers supporting approximately twenty different institutions including Pace University, Mercy College, and Seton Hall University.
 On April 11, 2007, Sallie Mae agreed to pay $2 million into a fund to educate college-bound students as part of a settlement with the New York Attorney General. The lender also agreed to no longer pay for travel and expenses for university officials, provide unpaid staffing assistance to financial aid offices, or operate call centers that provide financial advice for students where company employees identify themselves as university advisers.
 In April 2007, New York Attorney General Andrew Cuomo announced that his office would sue Drexel University. According to Cuomo's investigation, Drexel received over $124,000 from revenue sharing agreements with Education Finance Partners (EFP) and had accrued an additional $126,000 through March 2007. Since 2005, Drexel had sent over $16 million in loan volume to EFP as part of its preferred lender list.
 More than 60 colleges had "revenue sharing" agreements with Education Finance Partners. JP Morgan Chase was found to have spent $74,000 to "wine and dine" student loan officials from more than 200 colleges on board a Manhattan cruise ship in 2005. Additionally, the bank was shown to have employed five university loan officers while they still held positions at their respective colleges.
 At the University of Texas' Office of Student Financial Services, lenders were found to have provided gifts such as steakhouse dinners and ice cream carts in the hope of obtaining a place on the University's preferred lender list, with the office allegedly using the "treats" as a factor in evaluating lenders.
 Columbia University placed its Financial Aid Director, David Charlow, on leave and subsequently fired him after it was discovered that he held a financial interest in a student loan provider, Student Loan Xpress, that he promoted to parents and university alumni. It was discovered that he had earned more than $100,000 from sales of the company's stock in 2005, the year it was put on Columbia's preferred lender list.
 A Senate Report was released, detailing many of the unethical and deceptive practices occurring between financial aid offices and universities. One of the examples in the report describes how Nelnet, a lender based in Nebraska, created a point system to reward college officials who advised it. Contributing an idea for a product and completing an online survey each earned 25 credits. The credits could be redeemed for donations to an "alma mater or college/university of choice" at $1 each.

As a result of the corrupt practices revealed within the student lending industry, over $3 million was refunded to students and an additional $13.7 million was allocated to the National Education Fund, which New York Attorney General Andrew Cuomo established to inform students about the lending industry. Cuomo also created a student lending Code of Conduct., which eventually became New York State law as the Student Lending Accountability, Transparency, and Enforcement (SLATE) Act of 2007. It contains guidelines and prohibitions regarding revenue sharing, gifts and trips, advisory board compensation, preferred lender lists, loan resale disclosures, and call center operations. On the federal level, the Student Loan Sunshine Act was passed in May 2007; it included provisions banning gifts, perks, and revenue-sharing agreements between lenders and schools, and also requires institutions to disclose all relationships with lenders and ensure that students have access to all lenders of their choice, including those not on "Preferred Lender Lists".

Bankruptcy 

MRU was forced to cease further loan origination on September 8, 2008 due to the financial crisis and the increasingly limited supply of capital for making new loans from MRU's lenders, some of the largest investment banks in the world. As a result of the worsening crisis, on February 9, 2009, MRU Holdings, Inc., the parent holding company of MyRichUncle, filed for Chapter 7 bankruptcy liquidation and suspended all its operations. The company had received a payment acceleration notice from Longview Marquis Master Fund LP due to the breach of a loan covenant that required MRU to reduce its receivables to $5 million by January 28, 2009.<

Subsequent legal action 
Co-founder Raza Khan sued Vishal Garg in 2013, claiming that he had siphoned money and technical assets from their subsequent company, EIFC, a loan evaluator, and sued Embark in 2014, alleging improper use of funds owed to universities and improper financial statements by Garg and others.

Recognition
MyRichUncle was listed as number 16 among Fast Companys 2006 "Fast 50".
Raza Khan and Vishal Garg, co-founders, were featured in 2006 as BusinessWeeks "Tech's Best Young Entrepreneurs".
MyRichUncle is featured in Footing The Tuition Bill: The New Student Loan Sector, edited by Frederick M. Hess, and the college textbook Marketing: Real People, Real Choices (5th edition) by Michael R. Solomon, Greg Marshall, and Elnora Stuart.

References

External links
MyRichUncle official site (archive)

Education finance in the United States
Defunct financial services companies of the United States
Defunct companies based in New York City
Companies based in New York (state)
2009 disestablishments in New York (state)